The discography of Joe Nichols, an American country music singer, consists of twenty seven singles and ten studio albums.

At age 19, he made his debut in 1996 with a self-titled album on the independent Intersound label. It was not until the release of his 2002 single "The Impossible" on the Universal South Records (now Show Dog-Universal Music) label that Nichols first reached Top 40 on the country charts. The single, which peaked at number three on the Billboard Hot Country Singles & Tracks (now Hot Country Songs) charts, was followed by the release of his platinum-certified second album, Man with a Memory, released in 2002. This album also produced the Number One single "Brokenheartsville".

Nichols followed up Man with a Memory in 2004 with Revelation (which included the Top Five hit "What's a Guy Gotta Do"), and an album of Christmas music entitled A Traditional Christmas. His fourth album, 2005's gold-certified III, produced the Number One single "Tequila Makes Her Clothes Fall Off". Real Things followed in 2007, and Old Things New, which produced Nichols' third Number One hit in "Gimmie That Girl", was released in 2009. Following the release of Old Things New, Nichols' label went through a merge to become Show-Dog Universal Music, through which he released his seventh album, It's All Good, in 2011. It produced only one chart single in "Take It Off" (which failed to reach the Top 20), and he parted ways with his label.

In late 2012, Nichols was signed to Red Bow Records, as the flagship artist for the new label. Under Red Bow, Nichols released his eighth album, 2013's Crickets. The album produced two Number One hits in "Sunny and 75" and "Yeah".

Studio albums

1990s and 2000s

2010s–present

Christmas albums

Compilation albums

Singles

1990s

2000s

2010s–present

Other singles

Featured singles

Other charted songs

Other appearances

Music videos

Notes

References

Country music discographies
 
 
Discographies of American artists